Rohit (Devanagri: रोहित)) is a given name, typically male, used among Indian people. It is also used in some parts of Nepal. It is mostly used by Jains, Hindus, and Sikhs.

The word "rohit" signifies the color red. It is derived from Sanskrit, meaning "the first rays of the sun". The early morning sunlight usually has a reddish tint. It is also said to be derived from the Sanskrit word Rohitah (रोहित:) which signifies a red coloured deer – a form which Brahma once took. .

Rohit is also one of the names of the Hindu God Vishnu, when he is said to have first arrived on earth as a beautiful red fish. It appears in the Vishnu Sahasranam (विष्णु सहस्रणाम, "1000 names of Vishnu"). Rohit also means a person who leads his family to growth and development (a commonly held belief in Hindu families). Rohit was also the name of one of Krishna's sons.

Indian cricket team’s captain Rohit Sharma is versatile known alumni with this name.

Notable people

Given name
Rohit Asnodkar (born 1986), Indian cricketer
Rohit Bal (born 1961), Indian fashion designer
Rohit Bakshi (actor), Indian television actor
Rohit Bakshi (neurologist), American neurologist
Rohit Bansal, Indian entrepreneur and businessman
Rohit Bhardwaj, Indian television actor and model
C. Rohit Yadav (born 1995), Indian badminton player
Rohit Chadda (born 1982), Indian entrepreneur and investor 
Rohit Chand (born 1992), Nepali football player
Rohit Chopra, American consumer advocate
Rohit Jugraj Chauhan, Indian writer and director in the Punjabi cinema and Bollywood film industry
Rohit Dahiya (born 1988), Indian cricketer
Rohit Danu (born 2002), Indian footballer 
Rohit Deshpande, American economist
Rohit Dhruw (born 1982), Indian cricketer
Rohit Gupta, Indian American film director, producer and editor
Rohit Iyengar (born 1995), Dubai-based Indian artist
Rohit Jhalani (born 1978), Indian cricketer
Rohit Jhanjhariya (born 1990), Indian cricketer
Rohit Kalia, Indian Australian actor and model who appears in English, Hindi, Tamil and Telugu language films and television serials
Rohit Jivanlal Parikh (born 1936), American mathematician, logician, and philosopher of Indian origin
Rohit Khandelwal (born 1989), Indian model, actor, television personality, winner of Mr India 2015
Rohit "Ro" Khanna (born 1976), U.S. Congressman from Fremont, California
Rohit Khare, American computer science entrepreneur 
Rohit Khosla (1958–1994), pioneer of contemporary fashion industry in India
Rohit Khurana, Indian television actor
Rohit Kumar (born 1997), Indian footballer
Rohit Kumar (kabaddi), Indian kabaddi player
Rohit Mehra (cricketer) (born 1978), Indian cricketer
Rohit Kumar Mehraulia (born 1976), Indian politician
Rohit Nair (born 1990), Indian film actor
Rohit Paudel (born 2002), Nepalese cricketer
Rohit Phalke (born 1997), Indian actor, writer and director
Rohit Purohit (born 1986), Indian television actor
Rohit Raj (born 1993), Indian cricketer
Rohit Raju, Indian wrestler
Rohit Rayudu (born 1994), Indian cricketer
Rohit Roy, Indian television star
Rohit Sabharwal (born 1978), Indian cricketer
Rohit Suresh Saraf (born 1996), Indian actor
Rohit Sardana, Indian journalist, editor, columnist, anchor and media personality
Rohit Sharma (disambiguation), various individuals with the name
Rohit Sharma (born 1987), Indian cricketer
Rohit Sharma (composer), Indian film-composer
Rohit Sharma (politician), Fijian politician 
Rohit Shetty (born 1973), Indian film director, presenter and cinematographer
Rohit Suchanti, Indian television actor 
Rohit Shukla, major in the Indian Army 
Rohit Talwar (1965–2014), Indian cricketer
Rohit Varma, Indian American ophthalmologist

Surname
Arya Rohit, Indian model, television presenter and actress in Malayalam films and television
Esha Rohit (born 1998), Emirati cricketer
Damodaran Rohit (born 1992), Indian cricketer
Minal Rohit, Indian scientist and systems engineer with the Indian Space Research Organisation
Nara Rohit (born 1984), Indian Tollywood film actor
Ramalingam Rohit (born 1992), Indian cricketer

Fictional characters
Rohit Mehra (Krrish), a character in the Krrish franchise

References 

Indian masculine given names